The 2021 Toyota Owners 400 was a NASCAR Cup Series race held on April 18, 2021, at Richmond Raceway in Richmond, Virginia. Contested over 400 laps on the 0.75 mile (1.2 km) asphalt short track, it was the ninth race of the 2021 NASCAR Cup Series season.

Report

Background

Richmond Raceway is a 3/4-mile (1.2 km), D-shaped, asphalt race track located just outside Richmond, Virginia in Henrico County. It hosts the NASCAR Cup Series and Xfinity Series. Known as "America's premier short track", it formerly hosted a NASCAR Camping World Truck Series race, an IndyCar Series race, and two USAC sprint car races.

Entry list
 (R) denotes rookie driver.
 (i) denotes driver who are ineligible for series driver points.

Qualifying
Martin Truex Jr. was awarded the pole for the race as determined by competition-based formula.

Starting Lineup

Race

Martin Truex Jr. was awarded the pole. Truex, along with Denny Hamlin dominated, but Hamlin won both stages and led the most laps. Ryan Newman and Kevin Harvick both spun into the wall after having flat tires. Hamlin continued his domination, but would be passed for the lead by Alex Bowman, who recovered from an uncontrolled tire penalty, with ten laps to go and Bowman pulled away for his third career Cup Series victory and taking the 48 to victory lane for the first time since Jimmie Johnson at Dover in 2017.

Stage Results

Stage One
Laps: 80

Stage Two
Laps: 155

Final Stage Results

Stage Three
Laps: 165

Race statistics
 Lead changes: 20 among 7 different drivers
 Cautions/Laps: 5 for 39
 Red flags: 0
 Time of race: 3 hours, 6 minutes and 57 seconds
 Average speed:

Media

Television
Fox Sports covered their 20th race at the Richmond Raceway. Mike Joy, two-time Richmond winners Jeff Gordon and Clint Bowyer called the race from the broadcast booth. Jamie Little and Regan Smith handled pit road for the television side. Larry McReynolds provided insight from the Fox Sports studio in Charlotte.

Radio
MRN had the radio call for the race which was simulcasted on Sirius XM NASCAR Radio. Alex Hayden, Jeff Striegle and Rusty Wallace called the race in the booth when the field raced down the frontstretch. Dave Moody called the race from a platform inside the backstretch when the field races down the backstretch. Steve Post and Jason Toy worked pit road for the radio side.

Standings after the race

Drivers' Championship standings

Manufacturers' Championship standings

Note: Only the first 16 positions are included for the driver standings.
. – Driver has clinched a position in the NASCAR Cup Series playoffs.

References

Toyota Owners 400
Toyota Owners 400
Toyota Owners 400
NASCAR races at Richmond Raceway